Camera Café may refer to:

 Caméra Café, French television series released in 2001
 Camera Café (Italian TV series), 2003-2017
 Camera Café (Spanish TV series), television series released in 2005
 Camera Café (Philippine TV series), television series released in 2007